Mark David Hall (born 22 February 1966) Mark David Hall is Herbert Hoover Distinguished Professor of Politics and Faculty Fellow in the Honors Program at George Fox University.  He is also a Senior Fellow at the Center for Religion, Culture, and Democracy, an initiative of First Liberty Institute, Associate Faculty at the Center for the Study of Law and Religion at Emory University, a Senior Fellow at Baylor University’s Institute for Studies of Religion.  In 2022-2023, he is the Garwood Visiting Fellow at Princeton University’s James Madison Program and a Visiting Scholar at the Mercatus Center.

Mark is the author of a number of books on religion and politics in American life. The majority of his research has been in religion in the American founding era.  His next book, Proclaim Liberty Throughout All the Land: How Christianity Has Advanced Freedom and Equality for All Americans, will be published in April of 2023.

Education 
In 1988, Hall received a BA in political science from Wheaton College (Illinois) and in 1993 received his PhD in government from University of Virginia.

Early career 
Prior to his 2001 hiring at George Fox University, he taught from 1993 to 2001 at East Central University, first as an assistant and then an associate professor. He has served as Herbert Hoover Distinguished Professor of Politics at George Fox since 2005, and Faculty Fellow in the Honors Program since 2013.  His primary teaching fields are great books, political theory, constitutional law, and religion and politics in America.

Later career 
Hall's scholarly work is focused on issues of religion in the American founding era. In particular, his writing is often concerned with the perception that the Founders were deists who desired the strict separation of church and state.  Instead, he argues that there are good reasons to believe many Founders were influenced by orthodox Christianity and that virtually none of them favored anything approximating a contemporary understanding of the separation of church and state. Hall argues that this has impacted how the Supreme Court has interpreted the religion clauses of the First Amendment.

Selected bibliography

Books 
 Hall, Mark David. Proclaim Liberty Throughout All the Land: How Christianity Has Advanced Freedom and Equality for All Americans. Fidelis Publishing, 2023. 
 Hall, Mark David. Did America Have a Christian Founding? Separating Myth from Historical Truth. Thomas Nelson, 2019. 
 Hall, Mark David and Daniel L. Dreisbach, ed. Great Christian Jurists in American History. New York: Cambridge University Press, 2019. 
 Hall, Mark David and Daryl Charles, ed. America and the Just War Tradition: A History of U.S. Conflicts. Notre Dame: University of Notre Dame Press, 2019. 
 Hall, Mark David, ed. Collected Works of Roger Sherman. Indianapolis: Liberty Fund Press, 2016.
 Hall, Mark David. Roger Sherman and the Creation of the American Republic. New York: Oxford University Press, 2013. 
 Hall, Mark David. Roger Sherman and the Creation of the American Republic. Oxford Scholarship Online: Oxford University Press, 2013.
 Hall, Mark David and Gary L. Gregg II. America's Forgotten Founders. Wilmington: ISI Books, 2011.  
 Hall, Mark David and Daniel L. Dreisbach, ed. The Sacred Rights of Conscience: Selected Readings on Religious Liberty and Church-State Relations in the American Founding. Indianapolis: Liberty Fund Press, 2009.  
 Hall, Mark David, Daniel L. Dreisbach, and Jeffry H. Morrison, ed. The Forgotten Founders on Religion and Public Life. Notre Dame: University of Notre Dame Press, 2009. 
 Hall, Mark David, Kermit L. Hall, and James Wilson, ed. Collected Works of James Wilson, 2 Vols. Indianapolis: Liberty Funds Press, 2007.
 Hall, Mark David, Daniel L. Dreisbach, and Jeffry H. Morrison, ed. The Founders on God and Government. Lanham: Rowman & Littlefield Publishers, 2004.
 Hall, Mark David. The Political and Legal Philosophy of James Wilson, 1742-1798. Columbia: University of Missouri, 1997.

Journal articles 
 
  Pdf.

References

External links
 Hall's Author Page
 Hall’s Listing on the Christians in Political Science website
 Hall’s Faculty Page at George Fox University
 Link to "Jeffersonian Walls and Madisonian Lines," which surveys the Supreme Court's use of history in First Amendment jurisprudence
 Hall's Lecture at the Heritage Foundation on "Religious Liberty and the Founding of America"

1966 births
Living people
Wheaton College (Illinois) alumni
George Fox University faculty
University of Virginia alumni
East Central University faculty